The University of Toronto has had 16 presidents since it was founded in 1827 as King's College.

List of presidents

References

External links
 University of Toronto – Office of the President

University of Toronto people
Toronto
Toronto-related lists